The Murder Machine is a pamphlet by Patrick Pearse published in January 1916 on the topic of educating Irish schoolchildren.

Background

Pearses' own education
Pearse himself attended a private school from 1886 to 1891, then CBS Westland Row from 1891 to 1896. He took the matriculation exam of the Royal University of Ireland in 1898 and was awarded BA and BL degrees by 1901. His BA subjects were Irish, English and French.

Pearse as educator
He was employed by the Christian Brothers as a tutor teacher in the CBS. As well as attending lectures at University College Dublin he also gave part-time lectures on Irish there from 1899 to 1902 and he taught Irish in Alexandra College from 1904 to 1905. He gave more formal lectures on Irish in UCD from 1906.

He was active in running St. Enda's School.

Essay
In the essay he condemned the existing school system for excluding "the national factor". He also wrote that "The  school  system  which  neglects  it,  commits,  even  from  the  purely  pedagogic  point  of  view,  a  primary  blunder. It  neglects  one  of  the  most  powerful  of  educational  resources". He argued that "In  a  true  education  system  religion,  patriotism,  literature, art and science would be brought in such a way into the lives of boys and girls as to affect their character and conduct".

He argued for reform that was no more than "a plea for freedom within the law". Teachers should be free to decide what pupils needed to learn without the burden of state examination system. In a future independent Ireland the school system would be bilingual.

He opposed the state with the state emphasis on standardised curriculums and exams. Schools were largely church run, though he only referred in passing to Clongowes Wood College and a passing reference to the church maintaining "a portion of the machinery".

References

External links
 The Murder Machine – Corpus of Electronic Texts – University College Cork
 Pearse and Education – Heritage Ireland

Irish essays
Essays about education
Works by Patrick Pearse